Nakhchivan., also transliterated as Nakhichevan may refer to:

 Nakhchivan Autonomous Republic, an exclave of Azerbaijan
 Nakhichevan Autonomous Soviet Socialist Republic, within the Azerbaijan SSR of the Soviet Union, 1921–1990
 Nakhchivan (city), the capital city of either Republic
 Nakhichevan Eyalet, a possible eyalet of the Ottoman Empire
 Nakhichevan Khanate, in Safavid Persia, 1747–1828
 Nakhichevan District, old name of Babek District, a rayon of Azerbaijan in the Nakhchivan Autonomous Republic
 Nakhichevan field, an offshore oil and gas field on the Caspian Sea, Azerbaijan
 Nakhichevan-on-Don, Armenian city in Nor Nakchivan, 1779–1928
 Nakhichevan, a Russian cargo ship that sank in the Sea of Azov in 2007

See also 
 Nakhchivan Automobile Plant, Azerbaijan
 Nakhichevanik, a village in Askeran Region, Nagorno Karabakh Republic, coterminous with the Khojaly District, Azerbaijan
 Nakhichevansky Uyezd, in the Erivan Governorate of the Russian Empire, 1849–1920
 Nakhjavan Tappeh, a village in Urmia County, West Azerbaijan Province, Iran